Kaunas International Film Festival is a film festival founded in 2007 by Visos mūzos and held in October each year in Kaunas and Vilnius, Lithuania. It has at times visited other cities in the country, such as Panevėžys and Nida. Ilona Jurkonytė is the festival's artistic director and Tomas Tengmark is its programmer.

Purpose
The Kaunas International Film Festival was launched in 2007 with two aims in mind: to stop developers from turning the Romuva, Lithuania's oldest cinema, into a casino, and to seek homogenization of the country's film culture. It specifically celebrates art-house film making but shows indie and internationally acclaimed movies alike, both from and outside of Lithuania. The festival is associated with the network Eye on Films, which is hosted by Media Mundus, a member of the CICAE network, and the domestic arm of the European Network of Young Cinema NISI MASA. In addition to screenings, many panel discussions, masterclasses, and lectures are offered as part of the festival. Additional programmes change annually but the four constants are Wide Angle, which explores "contemporary tendencies in the film art"; Identity; Music Moves the World; and All the Muses, which are films focusing on art. The Silver Audience Award Cup was introduced in 2010.

The 2020 festival was held online due to the COVID-19 pandemic and was the first digital festival in Lithuania.

Years
 2007: September 28 through October 7
 Films from 32 countries; 1500 attendees
 Additional programme: "Retrospective: Nouvelle Vague"
 Audience award: White Palms, directed by Szabolcs Hajdu
 2008
 Films from 17 countries; 7000 attendees
 Additional programmes: Special Focus on Irish Film, "One Hundred Springtimes. Tribute to Vytautas Kernagis", and Train Time
 Opening film: Love and Other Crimes, directed by Stefan Arsenijević
 Favorite film: Bliss, directed by Abdullah Oğuz
 2009: October 1–17
 Additional programmes: Nordic Sounds in Film
 Favorite film: Welcome, directed by Philippe Lioret
 2010: October 1–17
 Additional programmes: Film retrospectives on Béla Tarr, Deimantas Narkevičius, and Piotr Dumała, Animation, Animated Film (Estonia and Latvia), Best of Slovenian Stop-motion Animation, Elephant Program for Children, Best of Clermont-Ferrand Short Film Festival (European short animation and short film), Special Screenings
 Opening film: Eastern Drift, directed by Šarūnas Bartas
 Silver Audience Award Cup (inaugural): Heartbeats, Xavier Dolan
 2011: September 27 - October 9
 Additional programmes: "After a Scene...", "Coming Attractions", "Films of the Golden Period: Slovak New Wave," Red Westerns, "Extended Glimpses", Tribute to Adolfas Mekas, Special screenings: Jonas Mekas Films, Special Screenings: Avant-garde women programme curated by Jonas Mekas
 Opening film: The Field of Magic, directed by Mindaugas Survila
 Silver Audience Award Cup: How much does your building weigh, Mr. Foster?, directed by Norbert López Amado and Carlos Carcaso
 2012
 Silver Audience Award Cup: Narcissus, directed by Dovile Gasiunaite
 2013: September 25–29
 90 films 
 Most popular film: Lore, directed by Cate Shortland
 2014
 Favorite film: The Reunion, directed by Anna Odell
 2015: September 30 - October 11
 Opening film: The Green Musketeers, directed by Jonas Ohman
 2016: No festival held
 2017: November 30 - December 13
 Opening film: Queues of Oblivion, directed by Alireza Khatami
 2018:  September 20–30
 2019: September 26 - October 6
 2020: March 19, April 2 (online only)
 Exhibitions Videograms (Harun Farock)
 Opening film: Proxima, directed by Alice Winocour
 2021: No festival due to the COVID-19 pandemic

References

Film festivals in Lithuania
Events in Kaunas
2007 establishments in Lithuania
Annual events in Lithuania
Culture in Kaunas
Autumn events in Lithuania